DD Nagaland is an English TV channel owned and operated by Prasar Bharati under Doordarshan, supported by Doordarshan studios in Kohima and Dimapur.  Launched in 1992 DD Nagaland has entertainment serials, infotainment programmes, news and current affairs, social programmes and film programmes as its major content. In terrestrial mode, DD Nagaland is available to 96.7% of the population of Nagaland. DD Nagaland TV channel is now available on DD Free dish channel number 106 in the MPEG4 slot.

History

A regional language satellite channel was launched on 15 August 1992, which became 24 hrs channel on 1 January 2000. This came to be later on christened as "DD Nagaland", which true to its name has been the true cultural ambassador of the State. It is the English language satellite channel supported by Doordarshan studios in Kohima and Dimapur. It has entertainment serials, infotainment programmes, news & current affairs, social programmes and film programmes as its major content. In terrestrial mode, DD Nagaland is available to 81.7% of the population of Nagaland. Today Doordarshan Kohima covers an area of 78.2% and population of 89.4%.

DD Nagaland has also telecasted programmes on promotion of fire safety at home work place, industry and at community level. Some of the past programs were: Agni Sanchike weekly T.V. serial programme and Fire Warden Organization, to provide an opportunity to volunteers to join hands with the Fire Services in improving fire safety awareness and quick reaction habits in the community. DD Nagaland channel also telecasted 20 commissioned programs, documentaries and software such as drama, telefilms and serials during the year 2004.

See also
 List of programs broadcast by DD National
 All India Radio
 Ministry of Information and Broadcasting
 DD Direct Plus
 List of South Asian television channels by country

References

External links 
 Doordarshan Official Internet site
 Doordarshan news site
 An article at PFC

Kannada-language television channels
Doordarshan
Foreign television channels broadcasting in the United Kingdom
Television channels and stations established in 1991
Direct broadcast satellite services
Indian direct broadcast satellite services
1991 establishments in Nagaland

bn:দূরদর্শন
de:Durdarshan
es:Doordarshan
hi:दूरदर्शन (चैनल)
id:Podhigai Tv
id:Doordarshan
kn:ಡಿಡಿ ಚಂದನ
ml:ദൂരദര്‍ശന്‍
te:దూరదర్శన్